The Farmington Town Pound is an historic animal pound in Farmington, New Hampshire. Built in 1823, it is one of the best-preserved 19th-century pounds in southeastern New Hampshire, and is now maintained by the Farmington Historical Society. It was listed on the National Register of Historic Places in 1993.

Description and history
The Farmington Town Pound is located near the geographic center of the roughly square town, on the northwest side of Pound Road north of its junction with Ten Rod Road. The walls are topped with long granite capstones.

From the early 18th century, towns in New Hampshire were required to fund the construction and maintenance of a structure in which to pen stray livestock until it could be claimed by its owner.  The early structures were typically of wood, and none of those are known to survive.  This pound was built in 1823 by the town, replacing an earlier wooden structure built in 1802, and is one of a few well-preserved pounds in southeastern New Hampshire.  It was built by Nicholas Colbath for $59, and was located on land purchased by the town from Hunkin Colbath for $5.  It remained in use until late in the 19th century, and was sold into private hands in 1918.  It was given back to the town, and is now maintained by the Farmington Historical Society.

Gallery

See also
National Register of Historic Places listings in Strafford County, New Hampshire

References

External links
Town Pound Article on Farmington Historical Society website

Government buildings on the National Register of Historic Places in New Hampshire
Buildings and structures completed in 1823
Buildings and structures in Strafford County, New Hampshire
National Register of Historic Places in Strafford County, New Hampshire
Farmington, New Hampshire